The 1985–86 Nationale 1A season was the 65th season of the Nationale 1A, the top level of ice hockey in France. 12 teams participated in the league, and Sporting Hockey Club Saint Gervais won their sixth league title. Chamonix Hockey Club and ASG Tours were relegated to the Nationale 2.

First round

Final round

Qualification round

Relegation
 Bordeaux Gironde Hockey 2000 - Ours de Villard-de-Lans 5:4/3:7

External links
Season on hockeyarchives.info

Fra
1985–86 in French ice hockey
Ligue Magnus seasons